The Lepidoptera of Liechtenstein consist of both the butterflies and moths recorded from Liechtenstein.

Butterflies

Hesperiidae
Carterocephalus palaemon (Pallas, 1771)
Erynnis tages (Linnaeus, 1758)
Hesperia comma (Linnaeus, 1758)
Ochlodes sylvanus (Esper, 1777)
Pyrgus alveus (Hübner, 1803)
Pyrgus andromedae (Wallengren, 1853)
Pyrgus cacaliae (Rambur, 1839)
Pyrgus malvae (Linnaeus, 1758)
Pyrgus malvoides (Elwes & Edwards, 1897)
Pyrgus serratulae (Rambur, 1839)
Spialia sertorius (Hoffmannsegg, 1804)
Thymelicus lineola (Ochsenheimer, 1808)
Thymelicus sylvestris (Poda, 1761)

Lycaenidae
Agriades glandon (de Prunner, 1798)
Agriades orbitulus (de Prunner, 1798)
Aricia artaxerxes (Fabricius, 1793)
Callophrys rubi (Linnaeus, 1758)
Celastrina argiolus (Linnaeus, 1758)
Cupido minimus (Fuessly, 1775)
Cyaniris semiargus (Rottemburg, 1775)
Eumedonia eumedon (Esper, 1780)
Favonius quercus (Linnaeus, 1758)
Glaucopsyche alexis (Poda, 1761)
Lycaena hippothoe (Linnaeus, 1761)
Lycaena tityrus (Poda, 1761)
Lysandra bellargus (Rottemburg, 1775)
Lysandra coridon (Poda, 1761)
Phengaris alcon (Denis & Schiffermuller, 1775)
Phengaris arion (Linnaeus, 1758)
Phengaris nausithous (Bergstrasser, 1779)
Phengaris teleius (Bergstrasser, 1779)
Plebejus argus (Linnaeus, 1758)
Plebejus idas (Linnaeus, 1761)
Polyommatus damon (Denis & Schiffermuller, 1775)
Polyommatus eros (Ochsenheimer, 1808)
Polyommatus icarus (Rottemburg, 1775)
Satyrium spini (Denis & Schiffermuller, 1775)
Satyrium w-album (Knoch, 1782)
Thecla betulae (Linnaeus, 1758)

Nymphalidae
Aglais io (Linnaeus, 1758)
Aglais urticae (Linnaeus, 1758)
Apatura ilia (Denis & Schiffermuller, 1775)
Apatura iris (Linnaeus, 1758)
Aphantopus hyperantus (Linnaeus, 1758)
Argynnis paphia (Linnaeus, 1758)
Boloria napaea (Hoffmannsegg, 1804)
Boloria pales (Denis & Schiffermuller, 1775)
Boloria dia (Linnaeus, 1767)
Boloria euphrosyne (Linnaeus, 1758)
Boloria selene (Denis & Schiffermuller, 1775)
Boloria thore (Hübner, 1803)
Boloria titania (Esper, 1793)
Brenthis ino (Rottemburg, 1775)
Coenonympha arcania (Linnaeus, 1761)
Coenonympha gardetta (de Prunner, 1798)
Coenonympha glycerion (Borkhausen, 1788)
Coenonympha oedippus (Fabricius, 1787)
Coenonympha pamphilus (Linnaeus, 1758)
Erebia aethiops (Esper, 1777)
Erebia epiphron (Knoch, 1783)
Erebia eriphyle (Freyer, 1836)
Erebia euryale (Esper, 1805)
Erebia gorge (Hübner, 1804)
Erebia ligea (Linnaeus, 1758)
Erebia manto (Denis & Schiffermuller, 1775)
Erebia medusa (Denis & Schiffermuller, 1775)
Erebia melampus (Fuessly, 1775)
Erebia meolans (Prunner, 1798)
Erebia mnestra (Hübner, 1804)
Erebia montanus (de Prunner, 1798)
Erebia oeme (Hübner, 1804)
Erebia pandrose (Borkhausen, 1788)
Erebia pharte (Hübner, 1804)
Erebia pluto (de Prunner, 1798)
Erebia pronoe (Esper, 1780)
Erebia tyndarus (Esper, 1781)
Euphydryas aurinia (Rottemburg, 1775)
Euphydryas cynthia (Denis & Schiffermuller, 1775)
Fabriciana adippe (Denis & Schiffermuller, 1775)
Fabriciana niobe (Linnaeus, 1758)
Issoria lathonia (Linnaeus, 1758)
Lasiommata maera (Linnaeus, 1758)
Lasiommata megera (Linnaeus, 1767)
Lasiommata petropolitana (Fabricius, 1787)
Limenitis camilla (Linnaeus, 1764)
Maniola jurtina (Linnaeus, 1758)
Melanargia galathea (Linnaeus, 1758)
Melitaea athalia (Rottemburg, 1775)
Melitaea aurelia Nickerl, 1850
Melitaea didyma (Esper, 1778)
Melitaea phoebe (Denis & Schiffermuller, 1775)
Minois dryas (Scopoli, 1763)
Nymphalis antiopa (Linnaeus, 1758)
Nymphalis polychloros (Linnaeus, 1758)
Oeneis glacialis (Moll, 1783)
Pararge aegeria (Linnaeus, 1758)
Polygonia c-album (Linnaeus, 1758)
Speyeria aglaja (Linnaeus, 1758)
Vanessa atalanta (Linnaeus, 1758)
Vanessa cardui (Linnaeus, 1758)

Papilionidae
Iphiclides podalirius (Linnaeus, 1758)
Papilio machaon Linnaeus, 1758
Parnassius apollo (Linnaeus, 1758)

Pieridae
Anthocharis cardamines (Linnaeus, 1758)
Aporia crataegi (Linnaeus, 1758)
Colias alfacariensis Ribbe, 1905
Colias hyale (Linnaeus, 1758)
Colias palaeno (Linnaeus, 1761)
Colias phicomone (Esper, 1780)
Gonepteryx rhamni (Linnaeus, 1758)
Leptidea sinapis (Linnaeus, 1758)
Pieris brassicae (Linnaeus, 1758)
Pieris bryoniae (Hübner, 1806)
Pieris napi (Linnaeus, 1758)
Pieris rapae (Linnaeus, 1758)
Pontia callidice (Hübner, 1800)

Riodinidae
Hamearis lucina (Linnaeus, 1758)

Moths

Adelidae
Nematopogon robertella (Clerck, 1759)

Argyresthiidae
Argyresthia albistria (Haworth, 1828)
Argyresthia goedartella (Linnaeus, 1758)
Argyresthia pruniella (Clerck, 1759)
Argyresthia retinella Zeller, 1839
Argyresthia semitestacella (Curtis, 1833)

Autostichidae
Deroxena venosulella (Moschler, 1862)

Bedelliidae
Bedellia somnulentella (Zeller, 1847)

Coleophoridae
Coleophora albidella (Denis & Schiffermuller, 1775)
Coleophora alticolella Zeller, 1849
Coleophora auricella (Fabricius, 1794)
Coleophora caespititiella Zeller, 1839
Coleophora discordella Zeller, 1849
Coleophora frischella (Linnaeus, 1758)
Coleophora laricella (Hübner, 1817)
Coleophora lixella Zeller, 1849
Coleophora mayrella (Hübner, 1813)
Coleophora ornatipennella (Hübner, 1796)
Coleophora striatipennella Nylander in Tengstrom, 1848
Coleophora taeniipennella Herrich-Schäffer, 1855
Coleophora versurella Zeller, 1849
Coleophora wockeella Zeller, 1849

Cossidae
Phragmataecia castaneae (Hübner, 1790)

Crambidae
Agriphila straminella (Denis & Schiffermuller, 1775)
Agriphila tristella (Denis & Schiffermuller, 1775)
Anania crocealis (Hübner, 1796)
Anania fuscalis (Denis & Schiffermuller, 1775)
Anania hortulata (Linnaeus, 1758)
Anania stachydalis (Germar, 1821)
Catoptria falsella (Denis & Schiffermuller, 1775)
Catoptria margaritella (Denis & Schiffermuller, 1775)
Catoptria permutatellus (Herrich-Schäffer, 1848)
Catoptria verellus (Zincken, 1817)
Chilo phragmitella (Hübner, 1805)
Chrysoteuchia culmella (Linnaeus, 1758)
Crambus pascuella (Linnaeus, 1758)
Crambus perlella (Scopoli, 1763)
Crambus pratella (Linnaeus, 1758)
Crambus silvella (Hübner, 1813)
Crambus uliginosellus Zeller, 1850
Diasemia reticularis (Linnaeus, 1761)
Donacaula mucronella (Denis & Schiffermuller, 1775)
Eudonia pallida (Curtis, 1827)
Evergestis forficalis (Linnaeus, 1758)
Evergestis pallidata (Hufnagel, 1767)
Nomophila noctuella (Denis & Schiffermuller, 1775)
Ostrinia nubilalis (Hübner, 1796)
Paratalanta pandalis (Hübner, 1825)
Platytes alpinella (Hübner, 1813)
Pleuroptya ruralis (Scopoli, 1763)
Pyrausta aurata (Scopoli, 1763)
Pyrausta despicata (Scopoli, 1763)
Pyrausta purpuralis (Linnaeus, 1758)
Scoparia basistrigalis Knaggs, 1866
Sitochroa palealis (Denis & Schiffermuller, 1775)
Sitochroa verticalis (Linnaeus, 1758)
Udea ferrugalis (Hübner, 1796)
Udea olivalis (Denis & Schiffermuller, 1775)
Udea prunalis (Denis & Schiffermuller, 1775)
Xanthocrambus lucellus (Herrich-Schäffer, 1848)

Drepanidae
Achlya flavicornis (Linnaeus, 1758)
Drepana falcataria (Linnaeus, 1758)
Habrosyne pyritoides (Hufnagel, 1766)
Ochropacha duplaris (Linnaeus, 1761)
Tethea or (Denis & Schiffermuller, 1775)
Tetheella fluctuosa (Hübner, 1803)
Thyatira batis (Linnaeus, 1758)
Watsonalla binaria (Hufnagel, 1767)
Watsonalla cultraria (Fabricius, 1775)

Elachistidae
Agonopterix angelicella (Hübner, 1813)
Agonopterix arenella (Denis & Schiffermuller, 1775)
Agonopterix pallorella (Zeller, 1839)
Elachista argentella (Clerck, 1759)
Elachista subocellea (Stephens, 1834)
Elachista alpinella Stainton, 1854
Ethmia dodecea (Haworth, 1828)

Epermeniidae
Epermenia illigerella (Hübner, 1813)

Erebidae
Arctia caja (Linnaeus, 1758)
Arctornis l-nigrum (Muller, 1764)
Atolmis rubricollis (Linnaeus, 1758)
Calliteara pudibunda (Linnaeus, 1758)
Colobochyla salicalis (Denis & Schiffermuller, 1775)
Cybosia mesomella (Linnaeus, 1758)
Diacrisia sannio (Linnaeus, 1758)
Eilema caniola (Hübner, 1808)
Eilema depressa (Esper, 1787)
Eilema griseola (Hübner, 1803)
Eilema lurideola (Zincken, 1817)
Euclidia mi (Clerck, 1759)
Euproctis similis (Fuessly, 1775)
Herminia grisealis (Denis & Schiffermuller, 1775)
Herminia tarsicrinalis (Knoch, 1782)
Herminia tarsipennalis (Treitschke, 1835)
Hypena proboscidalis (Linnaeus, 1758)
Hypenodes humidalis Doubleday, 1850
Laspeyria flexula (Denis & Schiffermuller, 1775)
Lymantria monacha (Linnaeus, 1758)
Orgyia antiqua (Linnaeus, 1758)
Pelosia muscerda (Hufnagel, 1766)
Phragmatobia fuliginosa (Linnaeus, 1758)
Phytometra viridaria (Clerck, 1759)
Polypogon tentacularia (Linnaeus, 1758)
Rhyparia purpurata (Linnaeus, 1758)
Rivula sericealis (Scopoli, 1763)
Scoliopteryx libatrix (Linnaeus, 1758)
Spilosoma lubricipeda (Linnaeus, 1758)
Thumatha senex (Hübner, 1808)

Gelechiidae
Acompsia cinerella (Clerck, 1759)
Athrips mouffetella (Linnaeus, 1758)
Helcystogramma rufescens (Haworth, 1828)
Monochroa lutulentella (Zeller, 1839)
Recurvaria leucatella (Clerck, 1759)
Sitotroga cerealella (Olivier, 1789)
Thiotricha subocellea (Stephens, 1834)

Geometridae
Abraxas sylvata (Scopoli, 1763)
Acasis viretata (Hübner, 1799)
Alcis bastelbergeri (Hirschke, 1908)
Alcis repandata (Linnaeus, 1758)
Angerona prunaria (Linnaeus, 1758)
Anticollix sparsata (Treitschke, 1828)
Apeira syringaria (Linnaeus, 1758)
Aplocera praeformata (Hübner, 1826)
Asthena anseraria (Herrich-Schäffer, 1855)
Biston betularia (Linnaeus, 1758)
Biston strataria (Hufnagel, 1767)
Bupalus piniaria (Linnaeus, 1758)
Cabera exanthemata (Scopoli, 1763)
Cabera pusaria (Linnaeus, 1758)
Campaea margaritaria (Linnaeus, 1761)
Camptogramma bilineata (Linnaeus, 1758)
Carsia sororiata (Hübner, 1813)
Catarhoe cuculata (Hufnagel, 1767)
Chariaspilates formosaria (Eversmann, 1837)
Chiasmia clathrata (Linnaeus, 1758)
Chlorissa viridata (Linnaeus, 1758)
Chloroclysta siterata (Hufnagel, 1767)
Chloroclystis v-ata (Haworth, 1809)
Cleora cinctaria (Denis & Schiffermuller, 1775)
Cleorodes lichenaria (Hufnagel, 1767)
Colostygia olivata (Denis & Schiffermuller, 1775)
Colostygia pectinataria (Knoch, 1781)
Colotois pennaria (Linnaeus, 1761)
Cosmorhoe ocellata (Linnaeus, 1758)
Crocallis elinguaria (Linnaeus, 1758)
Cyclophora linearia (Hübner, 1799)
Cyclophora annularia (Fabricius, 1775)
Deileptenia ribeata (Clerck, 1759)
Dysstroma citrata (Linnaeus, 1761)
Dysstroma truncata (Hufnagel, 1767)
Ecliptopera silaceata (Denis & Schiffermuller, 1775)
Ectropis crepuscularia (Denis & Schiffermuller, 1775)
Electrophaes corylata (Thunberg, 1792)
Elophos zelleraria (Freyer, 1836)
Ematurga atomaria (Linnaeus, 1758)
Ennomos erosaria (Denis & Schiffermuller, 1775)
Entephria caesiata (Denis & Schiffermuller, 1775)
Epione repandaria (Hufnagel, 1767)
Epirrhoe alternata (Muller, 1764)
Epirrhoe hastulata (Hübner, 1790)
Epirrhoe tristata (Linnaeus, 1758)
Eulithis testata (Linnaeus, 1761)
Eupithecia absinthiata (Clerck, 1759)
Eupithecia assimilata Doubleday, 1856
Eupithecia distinctaria Herrich-Schäffer, 1848
Eupithecia haworthiata Doubleday, 1856
Eupithecia icterata (de Villers, 1789)
Eupithecia intricata (Zetterstedt, 1839)
Eupithecia plumbeolata (Haworth, 1809)
Eupithecia pusillata (Denis & Schiffermuller, 1775)
Eupithecia satyrata (Hübner, 1813)
Eupithecia subfuscata (Haworth, 1809)
Eupithecia subumbrata (Denis & Schiffermuller, 1775)
Eupithecia tantillaria Boisduval, 1840
Eupithecia tenuiata (Hübner, 1813)
Eupithecia tripunctaria Herrich-Schäffer, 1852
Eupithecia valerianata (Hübner, 1813)
Eupithecia veratraria Herrich-Schäffer, 1848
Gandaritis pyraliata (Denis & Schiffermuller, 1775)
Gnophos furvata (Denis & Schiffermuller, 1775)
Hemistola chrysoprasaria (Esper, 1795)
Hemithea aestivaria (Hübner, 1789)
Horisme radicaria (de La Harpe, 1855)
Horisme vitalbata (Denis & Schiffermuller, 1775)
Hydria cervinalis (Scopoli, 1763)
Hydriomena furcata (Thunberg, 1784)
Hylaea fasciaria (Linnaeus, 1758)
Idaea aversata (Linnaeus, 1758)
Idaea biselata (Hufnagel, 1767)
Idaea dimidiata (Hufnagel, 1767)
Idaea inquinata (Scopoli, 1763)
Idaea muricata (Hufnagel, 1767)
Ligdia adustata (Denis & Schiffermuller, 1775)
Lobophora halterata (Hufnagel, 1767)
Lomaspilis marginata (Linnaeus, 1758)
Lomographa temerata (Denis & Schiffermuller, 1775)
Lycia hirtaria (Clerck, 1759)
Lycia zonaria (Denis & Schiffermuller, 1775)
Macaria alternata (Denis & Schiffermuller, 1775)
Macaria artesiaria (Denis & Schiffermuller, 1775)
Macaria liturata (Clerck, 1759)
Macaria signaria (Hübner, 1809)
Melanthia procellata (Denis & Schiffermuller, 1775)
Menophra abruptaria (Thunberg, 1792)
Mesotype didymata (Linnaeus, 1758)
Minoa murinata (Scopoli, 1763)
Odezia atrata (Linnaeus, 1758)
Opisthograptis luteolata (Linnaeus, 1758)
Pareulype berberata (Denis & Schiffermuller, 1775)
Pasiphila rectangulata (Linnaeus, 1758)
Peribatodes rhomboidaria (Denis & Schiffermuller, 1775)
Peribatodes secundaria (Denis & Schiffermuller, 1775)
Perizoma albulata (Denis & Schiffermuller, 1775)
Perizoma alchemillata (Linnaeus, 1758)
Perizoma flavofasciata (Thunberg, 1792)
Philereme vetulata (Denis & Schiffermuller, 1775)
Plemyria rubiginata (Denis & Schiffermuller, 1775)
Pterapherapteryx sexalata (Retzius, 1783)
Pungeleria capreolaria (Denis & Schiffermuller, 1775)
Scopula immutata (Linnaeus, 1758)
Scopula caricaria (Reutti, 1853)
Scopula immorata (Linnaeus, 1758)
Scopula nemoraria (Hübner, 1799)
Scopula nigropunctata (Hufnagel, 1767)
Scopula ornata (Scopoli, 1763)
Scotopteryx chenopodiata (Linnaeus, 1758)
Selenia dentaria (Fabricius, 1775)
Selenia tetralunaria (Hufnagel, 1767)
Siona lineata (Scopoli, 1763)
Thera britannica (Turner, 1925)
Thera cognata (Thunberg, 1792)
Thera variata (Denis & Schiffermuller, 1775)
Thera vetustata (Denis & Schiffermuller, 1775)
Theria primaria (Haworth, 1809)
Timandra griseata Petersen, 1902
Triphosa sabaudiata (Duponchel, 1830)
Xanthorhoe designata (Hufnagel, 1767)
Xanthorhoe ferrugata (Clerck, 1759)
Xanthorhoe fluctuata (Linnaeus, 1758)
Xanthorhoe montanata (Denis & Schiffermuller, 1775)
Xanthorhoe quadrifasiata (Clerck, 1759)
Xanthorhoe spadicearia (Denis & Schiffermuller, 1775)

Glyphipterigidae
Acrolepiopsis assectella (Zeller, 1839)
Glyphipterix thrasonella (Scopoli, 1763)
Orthotelia sparganella (Thunberg, 1788)

Gracillariidae
Aspilapteryx tringipennella (Zeller, 1839)
Caloptilia stigmatella (Fabricius, 1781)
Cameraria ohridella Deschka & Dimic, 1986
Gracillaria syringella (Fabricius, 1794)
Phyllonorycter platani (Staudinger, 1870)

Hepialidae
Hepialus humuli (Linnaeus, 1758)
Pharmacis fusconebulosa (DeGeer, 1778)
Pharmacis lupulina (Linnaeus, 1758)
Phymatopus hecta (Linnaeus, 1758)
Triodia sylvina (Linnaeus, 1761)

Incurvariidae
Incurvaria praelatella (Denis & Schiffermuller, 1775)

Lasiocampidae
Dendrolimus pini (Linnaeus, 1758)
Gastropacha quercifolia (Linnaeus, 1758)
Lasiocampa quercus (Linnaeus, 1758)
Lasiocampa trifolii (Denis & Schiffermuller, 1775)
Macrothylacia rubi (Linnaeus, 1758)
Malacosoma alpicola Staudinger, 1870
Poecilocampa alpina (Frey & Wullschlegel, 1874)
Poecilocampa populi (Linnaeus, 1758)
Trichiura crataegi (Linnaeus, 1758)

Limacodidae
Apoda limacodes (Hufnagel, 1766)

Micropterigidae
Micropterix calthella (Linnaeus, 1761)

Noctuidae
Abrostola triplasia (Linnaeus, 1758)
Acronicta euphorbiae (Denis & Schiffermuller, 1775)
Acronicta rumicis (Linnaeus, 1758)
Actebia praecox (Linnaeus, 1758)
Actinotia polyodon (Clerck, 1759)
Agrochola helvola (Linnaeus, 1758)
Agrochola litura (Linnaeus, 1758)
Agrochola lota (Clerck, 1759)
Agrochola macilenta (Hübner, 1809)
Agrochola circellaris (Hufnagel, 1766)
Agrotis exclamationis (Linnaeus, 1758)
Agrotis ipsilon (Hufnagel, 1766)
Agrotis segetum (Denis & Schiffermuller, 1775)
Amphipoea fucosa (Freyer, 1830)
Amphipoea oculea (Linnaeus, 1761)
Amphipyra perflua (Fabricius, 1787)
Amphipyra pyramidea (Linnaeus, 1758)
Anaplectoides prasina (Denis & Schiffermuller, 1775)
Anarta odontites (Boisduval, 1829)
Anorthoa munda (Denis & Schiffermuller, 1775)
Apamea crenata (Hufnagel, 1766)
Apamea lithoxylaea (Denis & Schiffermuller, 1775)
Apamea monoglypha (Hufnagel, 1766)
Apamea remissa (Hübner, 1809)
Apamea rubrirena (Treitschke, 1825)
Apamea scolopacina (Esper, 1788)
Apamea sordens (Hufnagel, 1766)
Apamea sublustris (Esper, 1788)
Apamea unanimis (Hübner, 1813)
Apterogenum ypsillon (Denis & Schiffermuller, 1775)
Archanara neurica (Hübner, 1808)
Athetis gluteosa (Treitschke, 1835)
Athetis pallustris (Hübner, 1808)
Autographa bractea (Denis & Schiffermuller, 1775)
Autographa gamma (Linnaeus, 1758)
Autographa jota (Linnaeus, 1758)
Autographa pulchrina (Haworth, 1809)
Axylia putris (Linnaeus, 1761)
Bryophila raptricula (Denis & Schiffermuller, 1775)
Caradrina morpheus (Hufnagel, 1766)
Caradrina clavipalpis Scopoli, 1763
Ceramica pisi (Linnaeus, 1758)
Cerastis leucographa (Denis & Schiffermuller, 1775)
Cerastis rubricosa (Denis & Schiffermuller, 1775)
Charanyca trigrammica (Hufnagel, 1766)
Charanyca ferruginea (Esper, 1785)
Chilodes maritima (Tauscher, 1806)
Chloantha hyperici (Denis & Schiffermuller, 1775)
Conistra vaccinii (Linnaeus, 1761)
Conistra rubiginea (Denis & Schiffermuller, 1775)
Cosmia trapezina (Linnaeus, 1758)
Cosmia pyralina (Denis & Schiffermuller, 1775)
Craniophora ligustri (Denis & Schiffermuller, 1775)
Cucullia lucifuga (Denis & Schiffermuller, 1775)
Cucullia umbratica (Linnaeus, 1758)
Deltote bankiana (Fabricius, 1775)
Deltote deceptoria (Scopoli, 1763)
Deltote uncula (Clerck, 1759)
Deltote pygarga (Hufnagel, 1766)
Denticucullus pygmina (Haworth, 1809)
Diachrysia chrysitis (Linnaeus, 1758)
Diachrysia chryson (Esper, 1789)
Diachrysia nadeja (Oberthur, 1880)
Diarsia brunnea (Denis & Schiffermuller, 1775)
Diarsia mendica (Fabricius, 1775)
Diarsia rubi (Vieweg, 1790)
Elaphria venustula (Hübner, 1790)
Eucarta amethystina (Hübner, 1803)
Euplexia lucipara (Linnaeus, 1758)
Eupsilia transversa (Hufnagel, 1766)
Euxoa decora (Denis & Schiffermuller, 1775)
Gortyna flavago (Denis & Schiffermuller, 1775)
Graphiphora augur (Fabricius, 1775)
Griposia aprilina (Linnaeus, 1758)
Hadena perplexa (Denis & Schiffermuller, 1775)
Hadena confusa (Hufnagel, 1766)
Heliothis peltigera (Denis & Schiffermuller, 1775)
Helotropha leucostigma (Hübner, 1808)
Hoplodrina ambigua (Denis & Schiffermuller, 1775)
Hoplodrina blanda (Denis & Schiffermuller, 1775)
Hoplodrina octogenaria (Goeze, 1781)
Hoplodrina superstes (Ochsenheimer, 1816)
Hydraecia micacea (Esper, 1789)
Ipimorpha retusa (Linnaeus, 1761)
Ipimorpha subtusa (Denis & Schiffermuller, 1775)
Lacanobia contigua (Denis & Schiffermuller, 1775)
Lacanobia suasa (Denis & Schiffermuller, 1775)
Lacanobia thalassina (Hufnagel, 1766)
Lacanobia oleracea (Linnaeus, 1758)
Lacanobia splendens (Hübner, 1808)
Lacanobia w-latinum (Hufnagel, 1766)
Lateroligia ophiogramma (Esper, 1794)
Leucania comma (Linnaeus, 1761)
Lithophane consocia (Borkhausen, 1792)
Lithophane ornitopus (Hufnagel, 1766)
Lithophane socia (Hufnagel, 1766)
Macdunnoughia confusa (Stephens, 1850)
Mamestra brassicae (Linnaeus, 1758)
Melanchra persicariae (Linnaeus, 1761)
Mesapamea secalis (Linnaeus, 1758)
Mesogona oxalina (Hübner, 1803)
Mesoligia furuncula (Denis & Schiffermuller, 1775)
Mniotype adusta (Esper, 1790)
Mniotype satura (Denis & Schiffermuller, 1775)
Mormo maura (Linnaeus, 1758)
Mythimna albipuncta (Denis & Schiffermuller, 1775)
Mythimna ferrago (Fabricius, 1787)
Mythimna l-album (Linnaeus, 1767)
Mythimna conigera (Denis & Schiffermuller, 1775)
Mythimna impura (Hübner, 1808)
Mythimna pudorina (Denis & Schiffermuller, 1775)
Mythimna straminea (Treitschke, 1825)
Mythimna turca (Linnaeus, 1761)
Noctua comes Hübner, 1813
Noctua fimbriata (Schreber, 1759)
Noctua interjecta Hübner, 1803
Noctua janthina Denis & Schiffermuller, 1775
Noctua pronuba (Linnaeus, 1758)
Ochropleura plecta (Linnaeus, 1761)
Oligia latruncula (Denis & Schiffermuller, 1775)
Oligia strigilis (Linnaeus, 1758)
Oligia versicolor (Borkhausen, 1792)
Orthosia gracilis (Denis & Schiffermuller, 1775)
Orthosia cerasi (Fabricius, 1775)
Orthosia cruda (Denis & Schiffermuller, 1775)
Orthosia incerta (Hufnagel, 1766)
Orthosia gothica (Linnaeus, 1758)
Pachetra sagittigera (Hufnagel, 1766)
Panthea coenobita (Esper, 1785)
Paradiarsia punicea (Hübner, 1803)
Peridroma saucia (Hübner, 1808)
Phlogophora meticulosa (Linnaeus, 1758)
Photedes minima (Haworth, 1809)
Plusia festucae (Linnaeus, 1758)
Polia bombycina (Hufnagel, 1766)
Polia nebulosa (Hufnagel, 1766)
Polymixis xanthomista (Hübner, 1819)
Pyrrhia umbra (Hufnagel, 1766)
Rhizedra lutosa (Hübner, 1803)
Sideridis rivularis (Fabricius, 1775)
Tholera decimalis (Poda, 1761)
Tiliacea aurago (Denis & Schiffermuller, 1775)
Trachea atriplicis (Linnaeus, 1758)
Trichoplusia ni (Hübner, 1803)
Xanthia icteritia (Hufnagel, 1766)
Xanthia togata (Esper, 1788)
Xestia ashworthii (Doubleday, 1855)
Xestia c-nigrum (Linnaeus, 1758)
Xestia ditrapezium (Denis & Schiffermuller, 1775)
Xestia triangulum (Hufnagel, 1766)
Xestia baja (Denis & Schiffermuller, 1775)
Xestia sexstrigata (Haworth, 1809)
Xestia stigmatica (Hübner, 1813)
Xestia xanthographa (Denis & Schiffermuller, 1775)
Xylena vetusta (Hübner, 1813)

Nolidae
Earias clorana (Linnaeus, 1761)
Nola aerugula (Hübner, 1793)
Nola cucullatella (Linnaeus, 1758)

Notodontidae
Cerura vinula (Linnaeus, 1758)
Clostera anachoreta (Denis & Schiffermuller, 1775)
Clostera curtula (Linnaeus, 1758)
Clostera pigra (Hufnagel, 1766)
Drymonia dodonaea (Denis & Schiffermuller, 1775)
Drymonia obliterata (Esper, 1785)
Drymonia querna (Denis & Schiffermuller, 1775)
Drymonia ruficornis (Hufnagel, 1766)
Furcula furcula (Clerck, 1759)
Gluphisia crenata (Esper, 1785)
Harpyia milhauseri (Fabricius, 1775)
Notodonta dromedarius (Linnaeus, 1767)
Notodonta ziczac (Linnaeus, 1758)
Odontosia carmelita (Esper, 1799)
Peridea anceps (Goeze, 1781)
Phalera bucephala (Linnaeus, 1758)
Pheosia gnoma (Fabricius, 1776)
Pheosia tremula (Clerck, 1759)
Pterostoma palpina (Clerck, 1759)
Ptilodon capucina (Linnaeus, 1758)
Ptilodon cucullina (Denis & Schiffermuller, 1775)
Ptilophora plumigera (Denis & Schiffermuller, 1775)
Stauropus fagi (Linnaeus, 1758)

Oecophoridae
Bisigna procerella (Denis & Schiffermuller, 1775)
Crassa unitella (Hübner, 1796)

Peleopodidae
Carcina quercana (Fabricius, 1775)

Plutellidae
Plutella xylostella (Linnaeus, 1758)

Praydidae
Prays fraxinella (Bjerkander, 1784)

Psychidae
Bacotia claustrella (Bruand, 1845)
Dahlica triquetrella (Hübner, 1813)
Epichnopterix plumella (Denis & Schiffermuller, 1775)
Taleporia tubulosa (Retzius, 1783)

Pterophoridae
Adaina microdactyla (Hübner, 1813)
Capperia celeusi (Frey, 1886)
Crombrugghia tristis (Zeller, 1841)
Emmelina monodactyla (Linnaeus, 1758)
Hellinsia inulae (Zeller, 1852)
Platyptilia isodactylus (Zeller, 1852)
Pterophorus pentadactyla (Linnaeus, 1758)

Pyralidae
Achroia grisella (Fabricius, 1794)
Acrobasis advenella (Zincken, 1818)
Anerastia lotella (Hübner, 1813)
Dioryctria abietella (Denis & Schiffermuller, 1775)
Hypochalcia ahenella (Denis & Schiffermuller, 1775)
Hypsopygia costalis (Fabricius, 1775)
Oncocera semirubella (Scopoli, 1763)
Phycita roborella (Denis & Schiffermuller, 1775)
Phycitodes albatella (Ragonot, 1887)
Phycitodes binaevella (Hübner, 1813)
Phycitodes inquinatella (Ragonot, 1887)
Pyralis farinalis (Linnaeus, 1758)

Saturniidae
Saturnia pavonia (Linnaeus, 1758)

Sesiidae
Bembecia ichneumoniformis (Denis & Schiffermuller, 1775)
Chamaesphecia empiformis (Esper, 1783)
Paranthrene tabaniformis (Rottemburg, 1775)
Pennisetia hylaeiformis (Laspeyres, 1801)
Sesia apiformis (Clerck, 1759)
Sesia bembeciformis (Hübner, 1806)
Sesia melanocephala Dalman, 1816
Synanthedon andrenaeformis (Laspeyres, 1801)
Synanthedon cephiformis (Ochsenheimer, 1808)
Synanthedon formicaeformis (Esper, 1783)
Synanthedon myopaeformis (Borkhausen, 1789)
Synanthedon soffneri Spatenka, 1983
Synanthedon spheciformis (Denis & Schiffermuller, 1775)
Synanthedon spuleri (Fuchs, 1908)
Synanthedon vespiformis (Linnaeus, 1761)

Sphingidae
Acherontia atropos (Linnaeus, 1758)
Agrius convolvuli (Linnaeus, 1758)
Deilephila elpenor (Linnaeus, 1758)
Deilephila porcellus (Linnaeus, 1758)
Hemaris fuciformis (Linnaeus, 1758)
Hemaris tityus (Linnaeus, 1758)
Hyles euphorbiae (Linnaeus, 1758)
Hyles gallii (Rottemburg, 1775)
Laothoe populi (Linnaeus, 1758)
Macroglossum stellatarum (Linnaeus, 1758)
Mimas tiliae (Linnaeus, 1758)
Smerinthus ocellata (Linnaeus, 1758)
Sphinx ligustri Linnaeus, 1758
Sphinx pinastri Linnaeus, 1758

Stathmopodidae
Stathmopoda pedella (Linnaeus, 1761)

Tortricidae
Acleris aspersana (Hübner, 1817)
Acleris effractana (Hübner, 1799)
Acleris emargana (Fabricius, 1775)
Acleris forsskaleana (Linnaeus, 1758)
Acleris lorquiniana (Duponchel, 1835)
Acleris sparsana (Denis & Schiffermuller, 1775)
Aethes hartmanniana (Clerck, 1759)
Aethes rubigana (Treitschke, 1830)
Agapeta zoegana (Linnaeus, 1767)
Ancylis apicella (Denis & Schiffermuller, 1775)
Ancylis obtusana (Haworth, 1811)
Ancylis unculana (Haworth, 1811)
Aphelia viburniana (Denis & Schiffermuller, 1775)
Aphelia paleana (Hübner, 1793)
Apotomis betuletana (Haworth, 1811)
Apotomis capreana (Hübner, 1817)
Apotomis semifasciana (Haworth, 1811)
Archips oporana (Linnaeus, 1758)
Archips podana (Scopoli, 1763)
Archips rosana (Linnaeus, 1758)
Archips xylosteana (Linnaeus, 1758)
Bactra lancealana (Hübner, 1799)
Celypha aurofasciana (Haworth, 1811)
Celypha doubledayana (Barrett, 1872)
Celypha lacunana (Denis & Schiffermuller, 1775)
Celypha rivulana (Scopoli, 1763)
Celypha rufana (Scopoli, 1763)
Celypha striana (Denis & Schiffermuller, 1775)
Cnephasia alticolana (Herrich-Schäffer, 1851)
Cnephasia asseclana (Denis & Schiffermuller, 1775)
Cnephasia pasiuana (Hübner, 1799)
Cnephasia incertana (Treitschke, 1835)
Cochylidia subroseana (Haworth, 1811)
Cydia fagiglandana (Zeller, 1841)
Cydia pomonella (Linnaeus, 1758)
Cydia splendana (Hübner, 1799)
Dichelia histrionana (Frolich, 1828)
Dichrorampha simpliciana (Haworth, 1811)
Eana osseana (Scopoli, 1763)
Endothenia ericetana (Humphreys & Westwood, 1845)
Endothenia gentianaeana (Hübner, 1799)
Endothenia quadrimaculana (Haworth, 1811)
Epiblema graphana (Treitschke, 1835)
Epinotia granitana (Herrich-Schäffer, 1851)
Epinotia nanana (Treitschke, 1835)
Epinotia ramella (Linnaeus, 1758)
Epinotia solandriana (Linnaeus, 1758)
Epinotia tedella (Clerck, 1759)
Epinotia tenerana (Denis & Schiffermuller, 1775)
Epinotia trigonella (Linnaeus, 1758)
Eucosma campoliliana (Denis & Schiffermuller, 1775)
Eupoecilia sanguisorbana (Herrich-Schäffer, 1856)
Falseuncaria ruficiliana (Haworth, 1811)
Gynnidomorpha alismana (Ragonot, 1883)
Gypsonoma dealbana (Frolich, 1828)
Hedya nubiferana (Haworth, 1811)
Hedya pruniana (Hübner, 1799)
Lathronympha strigana (Fabricius, 1775)
Lepteucosma huebneriana Kocak, 1980
Neosphaleroptera nubilana (Hübner, 1799)
Notocelia cynosbatella (Linnaeus, 1758)
Notocelia uddmanniana (Linnaeus, 1758)
Olindia schumacherana (Fabricius, 1787)
Orthotaenia undulana (Denis & Schiffermuller, 1775)
Pammene fasciana (Linnaeus, 1761)
Pammene ochsenheimeriana (Lienig & Zeller, 1846)
Pandemis cerasana (Hübner, 1786)
Pandemis cinnamomeana (Treitschke, 1830)
Pandemis corylana (Fabricius, 1794)
Pandemis dumetana (Treitschke, 1835)
Pandemis heparana (Denis & Schiffermuller, 1775)
Phiaris micana (Denis & Schiffermuller, 1775)
Phtheochroa inopiana (Haworth, 1811)
Pseudargyrotoza conwagana (Fabricius, 1775)
Pseudococcyx turionella (Linnaeus, 1758)
Pseudosciaphila branderiana (Linnaeus, 1758)
Ptycholomoides aeriferana (Herrich-Schäffer, 1851)
Rhopobota naevana (Hübner, 1817)
Sparganothis pilleriana (Denis & Schiffermuller, 1775)
Spilonota laricana (Heinemann, 1863)
Tortrix viridana Linnaeus, 1758
Zeiraphera griseana (Hübner, 1799)
Zeiraphera isertana (Fabricius, 1794)

Yponomeutidae
Yponomeuta evonymella (Linnaeus, 1758)
Yponomeuta padella (Linnaeus, 1758)
Yponomeuta plumbella (Denis & Schiffermuller, 1775)

Ypsolophidae
Ypsolopha dentella (Fabricius, 1775)
Ypsolopha ustella (Clerck, 1759)

Zygaenidae
Adscita geryon (Hübner, 1813)
Adscita statices (Linnaeus, 1758)
Zygaena purpuralis (Brunnich, 1763)
Zygaena filipendulae (Linnaeus, 1758)
Zygaena lonicerae (Scheven, 1777)
Zygaena loti (Denis & Schiffermuller, 1775)
Zygaena osterodensis Reiss, 1921
Zygaena transalpina (Esper, 1780)
Zygaena trifolii (Esper, 1783)
Zygaena viciae (Denis & Schiffermuller, 1775)

References

External links
Fauna Europaea

Liechtenstein
Liechtenstein
Liechtenstein
Lepidoptera
List